The combat sport of Muay Thai has been featured in media, including film, television, manga, anime and video games. It gained international attention when Yodtong Senanan led the Nak Muay Team against Osamu Noguchi's Kickboxer Team on October 16, 1972. It has heavily influenced the sport of kickboxing, and is used in mixed martial arts (MMA), where athletes train in its techniques.

Film
Muay Thai has been featured in the following films:

Documentaries

Television

Muay Thai has been featured in television series from reality show contests to documentary episodes.

Manga and Animation
Manga and anime shows occasionally feature characters who use Muay Thai techniques:

Video games
The following games feature characters that use Muay Thai as their fighting style,

Other
 Lumpini Gundam is a Gundam plastic model dressed in a Muay Thai outfit.

 Professional wrestler CM Punk uses a fighting style that incorporates elements of Muay Thai.
Jamie, a Progressive Insurance associate who is considered dull by his coworkers, is revealed to be a devotee of Muay Thai (among other exciting pursuits) while showing slides of his vacation in a 2020 Progressive commercial.

Notes

References

External links
Thai Martial Arts

Sports in popular culture